Splendour in the Grass 2019 was the nineteenth edition of the annual Australian music festival Splendour in the Grass. It was held on 19 to 21 July, 2019 at North Byron Parklands, Byron Bay, New South Wales, Australia. The festival was headlined by Australian psychedelic rock band Tame Impala, American musician Childish Gambino and Australian hip hop group Hilltop Hoods.

Line-up 
Headline performers are listed in Boldface. Artists listed from latest to earliest set times.

Amphitheatre 

{{Hidden
| headercss = color:#ffffff; background: #003366; font-size: 100%; width: 95%;;
| contentcss = text-align: left; font-size: 100%; width: 95%;;
| header = Amphitheater set lists
| content =

{{hidden
| headercss = color:#ffffff; background: #194F7D; font-size: 100%; width: 95%;;
| contentcss = text-align: left; font-size: 100%; width: 95%;;
| header = Tame Impala
| content =

"Let It Happen"
"Patience"
"The Moment"
"Mind Mischief"
"Nangs"
"Elephant"
"Feels Like We Only Go Backwards"
"Why Won't You Make Up Your Mind?"
"Eventually"
"Borderline"
"Apocalypse Dreams"

Encore
"The Less I Know the Better"
"New Person, Same Old Mistakes"

}}

}}

Mix Up 

House DJs performing between acts:

Friday: Merph, Body Promise, DJ Klasik

Saturday: Casual Connection, Donald's House, Dameeeela

Sunday: Ninajirachi, Close Counters, Lex Deluxe

McLennan

Tiny Dancer Stage

Red Bull Presents A Night With

Cancelled performers 
Chance the Rapper, due to illness, replaced by Hilltop Hoods.
MorMor, due to unknown reason, replaced by Spacey Jane.

References

2019 music festivals
Music festivals in Australia